is a run and gun video game created by Taito. It was released in arcades in 1990 and for the Mega Drive in 1991.

Plot
In the year 199X, the world was lost in a vortex of terror.  Malicious terrorism gripped the land, the sky, and the sea.  There were two brave men who fought against this reign of violence.  They were the anti-terrorism team, "THUNDER FOX."

Gameplay
Thunder Fox is a horizontally scrolling shooter, where the players take control of agents Thunder and Fox. Thunder is more efficient with firearms, while Fox is better in using a knife. The levels are all divided into multiple sections, from a military base to a plane. The action is focused on close combat with using the knife to attack, but there are also other weapons dropped by enemies like grenades, flame-throwers and handguns.

Reception
In Japan, Game Machine listed Thunder Fox on their August 15, 1990 issue as being the thirteenth most-successful table arcade unit of the month.

Leisure Line magazine reviewed the arcade game and rated it 8 out of 10.

Legacy
Thunder Fox was re-released for the Xbox and PlayStation 2 as part of the Taito Legends compilation.

References

External links
Thunder Fox at Arcade History

1990 video games
Arcade video games
Horizontally scrolling shooters
Taito arcade games
Video games about terrorism
Video games developed in Japan